Łęg Rokietnicki is a river of Poland, a left tributary of the San near Jarosław.

Rivers of Poland
Rivers of Podkarpackie Voivodeship